The Sessions Band is an American musical group that has periodically recorded and toured with American rock singer-songwriter Bruce Springsteen in various formations since 1997.

History 

The Sessions Band was first formed in October 1997. That September, Springsteen had organized a fiesta-themed party at his Colts Neck, New Jersey farm and invited the New York-based band The Gotham Playboys to provide entertainment. The next month, Springsteen was invited to donate a recording to an upcoming tribute album to folk singer Pete Seeger. He re-contacted the Playboys and some additional musicians whom he knew through E Street Band violinist Soozie Tyrell, and recorded a number of songs on November 2, 1997.  These included "We Shall Overcome", which was released on the 1998 tribute album, Where Have All The Flowers Gone: The Songs Of Pete Seeger.

The group was then disbanded for an extended period. In late 2004, while reviewing material for a possible follow-up to his Tracks box set, Springsteen stumbled upon these recordings and decided to release them as a stand-alone project. There was not enough material, however, so he reformed the band for what would become known as the Second Seeger Session on March 19, 2005. The third and, so far, final Seeger Session took place on January 21, 2006.

On April 25, 2006, the album was released as We Shall Overcome: The Seeger Sessions (so titled as each of the album's thirteen songs had been previously recorded or performed by Pete Seeger). The subsequent Bruce Springsteen with The Seeger Sessions Band Tour took this musical approach even further, with a travelling group partly composed of musicians from the sessions.  On October 3, 2006, the album was reissued as We Shall Overcome: The Seeger Sessions – American Land Edition with five additional tracks.  The album won the Grammy Award for Best Traditional Folk Album at the 49th Grammy Awards held in February 2007, and had sold 700,000 copies in the United States by January 2009; the RIAA certified it with gold record status.

Members of the Sessions Band occasionally guested on Springsteen and the E Street Band's 2007–2008 Magic Tour. After E Street Band organist Danny Federici ceased touring with the band due to melanoma in November 2007, and his subsequent death in April 2008, Sessions Band member Charles Giordano joined the E Street Band for the remainder of the Magic Tour and has been with the band ever since.

On Springsteen's 2009 Working on a Dream Tour with the E Street Band, Giordano was joined in the touring band by Sessions Band members Cindy Mizelle and Curtis King, who sang backup vocals. Curt Ramm also toured with the E Street Band for much of the final leg of the tour, playing trumpet on select songs. On Springsteen's 2012 Wrecking Ball Tour, Giordano, Mizelle, and King were joined in full-time roles by Ramm on trumpet, Ed Manion on saxophone, and Clark Gayton on trombone. Other members of the band occasionally guested at shows on the Working on a Dream Tour. Sam Bardfeld along with a string section that he fronted, appeared at a few shows on Springsteen's The River Tour 2016. Springsteen has indicated he would like to do another project with the Sessions Band in the future.

On May 16, 2015, Springsteen reunited with a version of the Sessions Band for a four-song set at the Kristen Ann Carr Fund's "A Night To Remember" event in tribute to Thom Zimny at Tribeca Grill in New York City. The band, billed for the evening as the 
Tribeca Playboys, consisted of Charles Giordano on accordion, Jeremy Chatzky on upright bass, Larry Eagle on drums, Sam Bardfeld and Soozie Tyrell on fiddle, Losa Lowell on vocals and guitar, Ed Manion on saxophone, and Curt Ramm on trumpet; the group was also joined by guests Nils Lofgren on guitar, Curtis King on vocals, and restaurateur and venue host Drew Nieporent on washboard.

Band members

Seeger Sessions Studio Band 
 Bruce Springsteen – lead vocals, guitar, harmonica, B3 organ, and percussion
 Sam Bardfeld – violin
 Art Baron – tuba
 Frank Bruno – guitar
 Jeremy Chatzky – upright bass
 Mark Clifford – banjo
 Larry Eagle – drums and percussion
 Charles Giordano – B3 organ, piano, and accordion
 Ed Manion – saxophone
 Mark Pender – trumpet, backing vocals
 Richie "La Bamba" Rosenberg – trombone, backing vocals
 Patti Scialfa – backing vocals
 Soozie Tyrell – violin, backing vocals
 Lisa Lowell-backing vocals

Sessions Band (touring band) 
The band ranged in size from 17 and 20 members on stage, depending upon availability on a given night. About half the members had played on the Seeger Sessions album, while the other half were new.

Bruce Springsteen – lead vocals, acoustic guitar, occasional harmonica
Marc "Chocolate Genius" Thompson – acoustic guitar, background vocals, some featured lead vocals
Patti Scialfa – acoustic guitar, background vocals, some featured duet vocals
Frank Bruno – acoustic guitar, some background vocals, occasional drums and washboard
Soozie Tyrell – violin, background vocals
Sam Bardfeld – violin
Greg Liszt – banjo
Marty Rifkin – pedal steel guitar
Charles Giordano – accordion, piano, organ
Jeremy Chatzky – upright bass, occasional electric bass
Larry Eagle – drums
Lisa Lowell – background vocals
Curtis King – background vocals
Cindy Mizelle – background vocals
Art Baron – tuba, occasional trombone
Eddie Manion – saxophones
Mark Pender and/or Curt Ramm – trumpet
Richie "La Bamba" Rosenberg and/or Clark Gayton – trombone

Discography 
Where Have All The Flowers Gone: The Songs of Pete Seeger (1998)
We Shall Overcome: The Seeger Sessions (2006)
We Shall Overcome: The Seeger Sessions - American Land Edition (2006)
Bruce Springsteen with The Sessions Band: Live in Dublin (2007)
Give Us Your Poor (2007)

References

Bruce Springsteen
Musical groups established in 1997
Musical backing groups